Hanza Rural District is a rural district (dehestan) in Hanza District, Rabor County, Kerman Province, Iran. At the 2006 census, its population was 6,193, in 1,323 families. The rural district has 43 villages.

References 

Rural Districts of Kerman Province
Rabor County